A traffic camera is a video camera which observes vehicular traffic on a road.  Typically, traffic cameras are put along major roads such as highways, freeways, expressways and arterial roads, and are connected by optical fibers buried alongside or under the road, with electricity provided either by mains power in urban areas, or by solar panels or other alternative power sources which provide consistent imagery without the threat of power outages.

A monitoring center receives the live video in real time, and serves as a dispatcher if there is a traffic collision, some other disruptive incident or road safety issue.

Traffic cameras form a part of most intelligent transportation systems.  They are especially valuable in tunnels, where safety equipment can be activated remotely based on information provided by the cameras and other sensors.  On surface roads, they are typically mounted on high poles or masts, sometimes with street lights.  On arterial roads, they are often mounted on traffic light poles at intersections, where problems are most likely. In remote areas beyond the electrical grid, they are usually powered by a renewable source such as solar power, which also provides a backup source to urban camera infrastructure.

Traffic cameras are distinct from road safety cameras, which are put in specific places to enforce rules of the road by taking still photos in a much higher image resolution upon a trigger. Traffic cameras are only for observation and continuously take lower-resolution video, often in full motion, though they may be remotely controlled to focus on an incident in the distance, or at an orientation normally outside its field of view; such as a frontage road. Many transmit in analog television formats, though many are being converted to high definition or 4K resolution video as equipment is replaced. Some have a compass built in which displays the cardinal direction at which the camera is aimed, though many installers also provide a reference image with the cardinal direction.

A non-public use for traffic cameras is video tolling, where motorists drive through open road tolling gantries, have an image of their license plate taken, then are billed after automatic number-plate recognition has read the license plate and cross-referenced it with motor vehicle databases.

Many transportation departments have linked their camera networks to the internet so that travelers can view traffic conditions. They may show either streaming video or still imagery which refreshes at a set interval, helping travelers determine whether an alternate route should be taken. In the United States and Canada, these often are displayed on state or municipally-run 5-1-1 websites (511 being a telephone service relaying traffic information).  These image may be combined with in-road sensors that measure traffic timing and mapping providers such as Google Maps/Waze that allow user-generated traffic information.

Many states and provinces consider this information public domain, thus many television stations air live traffic camera imagery during traffic reports on their local news broadcasts, or simply as a moving background during newscasts. Some cable TV systems provide these pictures full-time on a governmental access channel, and some broadcast stations set aside a full digital subchannel solely for traffic information and camera imagery, such as WMVT-DT3 in Milwaukee and WFMZ-DT2 in Allentown, Pennsylvania. However, in some cases for toll roads and other private road authorities, such as the Illinois State Toll Highway Authority, these images are the property of the toll agency (or private company which runs a toll road), and are released exclusively to one station (e.g. ISTHA feeds only to WMAQ-TV).

Gallery

External links

Traffic Cams throughout the province of British Columbia, Canada
Traffic Cams throughout the province of Saskatchewan, Canada
Traffic Cams throughout the province of Manitoba, Canada
Map of live traffic cameras in U.S. Cities 
Map of live traffic cameras the Twin Cities 
Live traffic cameras in Queensland, Australia Department of Main Roads
Traffic cameras in the State of New Jersey Department of Transportation
Live traffic cameras in New Zealand NZ Transport Agency
Live traffic cameras in Southern and Eastern Ontario, Canada

Intelligent transportation systems